Harry Wilkinson (2 May 1903–1997) was an English footballer who played in the Football League for Oldham Athletic and Southport.

References

1903 births
1997 deaths
English footballers
Association football midfielders
English Football League players
Oldham Athletic A.F.C. players
Bolton Wanderers F.C. players
Mossley A.F.C. players
Southport F.C. players
Ashton National F.C. players